DeLoach is a surname. Notable people with the surname include:

Aaron DeLoach, American soccer player
Bill DeLoach, American singer, keyboardist, guitarist, composer, vocal arranger, musical director, and music producer
Darryl DeLoach, American singer
Deke DeLoach, American deputy director of the Federal Bureau of Investigation
Gary DeLoach, American football coach
Heather DeLoach, American actress
Janay DeLoach Soukup, American athlete
Jay A. DeLoach, director of Naval History
Jerry DeLoach, American football player
Joe DeLoach, American sprinter
Nikki DeLoach, American actress
Ralph DeLoach, American football player